Francesco Angelo Grue (Castelli, Abruzzo, 11 September 1618 – 5 October 1673) was an Italian potter and painter.

Biography
Francesco was from a family of maiolica potters and painters. His son Carlo Antonio and grandson Francesco Antonio Xaverio Grue also followed in the family business.

References

17th-century Italian painters
Italian male painters
Italian potters
1673 deaths
1618 births
People from the Province of Teramo